Big Brother Slovenija 2015 is the third main season of the Slovenian version of Big Brother, which is broadcast on Kanal A. This is the first civilian season of Big Brother to air in Slovenia since 2008. The show also had a celebrity season in 2010, however, it aired on another channel, POP TV. Though the season launched on March 6, 2015, three housemates entered prior to the launch. These three housemates were already living in a Secret Room, without the audience or housemates knowledge. The host of the show this season Ana Maria Mitič. Due to budget restraints this season the house is not located in Slovenia. Instead, it is located in the old Veliki Brat house, in Serbia which was home to the Balkan version of the show. The Season was won by 21-year-old Pia Filipčič

Housemates

Ana H
Ana Hrovat is 22 and from Mislinja. Ana H was evicted on Day 105.

Ana J
Ana Jeler is 20 and from Piran. Ana J was part of the five new housemates who entered on day 50. Ana J walked out of the house on Day 62.

Ana Mari 
Ana Mari Panker is 22 and from Veščica. Ana Mari was the Runner Up on Day 106.

Darja 
Darja Vrbnjak is 46 and from Štore. She's the mother of David. Darja was evicted on Day 43.

David 
David Vrbnjak is a 25-year-old engineer from Štore. He's the son of Darja. David was evicted on Day 92.

Dijana 
Dijana Branilovič is 34 and from Jesenice. Dijana was evicted on Day 22.

Franc 
Franc Rozman is 68 and from Izola. Franc entered the house on day 50 as one of five new housemates. Franc was evicted on Day 78.

Ksenija 
Ksenija Kranjec is 23 and from Slovenj Gradec. Ksenija was evicted on Day 15.

Marko 
Marko Ubiparip is 21 and from Ljubljana. Marko was evicted on Day 29.

Martin 
Martin Flis is 24 and from Krško. Martin entered the house on day 50 along with four other housemates. Martin was evicted on Day 99.

Mitja 
Mitja Valant is 27 and from Drevenik. Mitja was one of five housemates to enter the house on day 50. Mitja was evicted on Day 105.

Natalija 
Natalija Mikložič is 27 and from Maribor. Natalija was one of the five new housemates to enter the house on day 50. Natalija was evicted on Day 64.

Nina 
Nina Golub is 21 and from Maribor. Nina was evicted on Day 57.

Pia 
Pia Filipčič is 21 and from Koper. She entered in a Secret Room the day before the launch. Shortly after entering the house it was revealed via media sources that Pia was born a biological male under the name Elvis Filipčič. Pia won the season on Day 106.

Sebastjan B 
Sebastjan Burnar is a 30-year-old programmer from Ivančna Gorica. Sebastjan B came Fourth on Day 106.

Sebastjan Z 
Sebastjan Zajc is 27 and from Moravče. Sebastjan z was evicted on Day 50.

Soraja 
Soraja Vučelić was a housemate in Veliki brat 2011 and Veliki Brat VIP 5. Soraja was evicted on Day 105

Suzana 
Suzana Jakšič was a housemate in Big Brother 1 and Kmetija Slavnih. Suzana was evicted on Day 105.

Tibor 
Tibor Baiee is 28 and from Ljubljana. Tibor was evicted on Day 71.

Tina 
Tina Lukić is 29 and from Maribor. She entered in a Secret Room the day before the launch. Tina walked out of the house on Day 39, 3 days after Ziga's eviction.

Tomaž 
Tomaž Jeraj is 35 and from Brezovica. He entered in a Secret Room the day before the launch. Tomaž came Third on Day 106.

Vlado 
Vlado Pilja is a singer. Vlado was evicted on Day 99.

Žiga 
Žiga Puconja is a 29-year-old fashion consultant from Ljubljana. Žiga was evicted on day 36.

Nominations table 
The first Housemate in each box was Nominated for Two Points, and the second Housemate was Nominated for One Point.

Blind Results

Total Nominations Received

Weekly task

Hotel Big Brother status
As part of the first task of the season, some housemates would be "Guests" while others would be "Servants". Throughout the task housemates roles would change whenever Big Brother saw fit.

Pairs
In the third week of the competition the contestants competed in pairs. These pairs were chosen by the housemates. The final pairs would compete to become the "Ultimate Pair".

Singing competition results
In week 4 the housemates competed in a singing competition in order to earn immunity in week 5. Below are the results of the public vote.

References

External links 
 

Slovenia
2015 Slovenian television seasons

sl:Big Brother Slovenija